The Soviet invasion of South Sakhalin, also known as the Battle of Sakhalin, was the Soviet invasion of the Japanese portion of Sakhalin Island known as Karafuto Prefecture. The invasion was part of the Soviet–Japanese War, a minor campaign in the Asian Theatre during Second World War.

Background 
Following the Japanese invasion of Sakhalin in 1905, control of the island was split according to the Treaty of Portsmouth, with the Russian Empire controlling the northern half and the Empire of Japan controlling the portion south of the 50th parallel north. It was known in Japan as Karafuto Prefecture and the Northern District.

During the Yalta Conference in 1945, Soviet Premier Joseph Stalin pledged to enter the fight against the Empire of Japan "two or three months after Germany has surrendered and the war in Europe is terminated." That would create another strategic front against Japan, which was deemed necessary to end the war. As a result of their participation, the Soviets would be awarded South Sakhalin and the Kuril Islands, among other concessions. The United States would aid the Red Army in Project Hula in preparation for the invasion.

On 5 April, the Soviets formally repudiated the Soviet–Japanese Neutrality Pact.

On 9 August, the Soviets launched a full-scale invasion of Manchuria, which started the Soviet–Japanese War. That war began three days after the United States atomic bombing of Hiroshima, and it included plans to invade South Sakhalin. The main purpose of the invasion was to clear Japanese resistance and to be prepared within 10 to 14 days to invade Hokkaido, the northernmost of Japan's home islands.

Order of battle

Soviet Union 
2nd Far Eastern Front (commanded by General of the Army Maksim Purkayev)
16th Army (commanded by General Leonty Cheremisov)
56th Rifle Corps
79th Rifle Division
2nd Rifle Brigade
5th Rifle Brigade
214th Tank Brigade
113th Rifle Brigade
255th Composite Aviation Division (106 aircraft)
Pacific Fleet (commanded by Admiral Ivan Yumashev)
Northern Pacific Flotilla (commanded by Vice-Admiral V.A. Andreev)
Pacific Fleet naval aircraft (80 aircraft)
365th Naval Infantry Battalion

Imperial Japan 
88th Infantry Division of the Japanese Fifth Area Army (commanded by Lieutenant General Kiichiro Higuchi)
Karafuto fortified area (17 bunkers, 28 artillery, 18 and mortar positions and others. Facilities, the garrison – 5400 people) of the Border Guard
Detachments of Reservists

Invasion

Karafuto Line
On 11 August, the Soviet 16th Army commenced the ground invasion from northern Sakhalin of the southern portion of Sakhalin Island controlled by Japan. The Soviet advance was halted by the strenuous Japanese defense of the Karafuto Fortress defense line. The Soviet 16th Army which consisted of roughly 20,000 men and supported by 100 tanks outnumbered the Japanese defenders 3 to 1. However the Soviet advance was minimal and held off for four days on the Karafuto line.

On 15 August, Imperial Japanese headquarters issued the order to halt all offensive combat operations and engage in a cease-fire dialogue; however, the 5th Area Army issued a contrary order to the 88th Division to defend Sakhalin to the last man. The same day 3,000 Japanese troops surrendered the Karafuto Line. Japanese military casualties were 568 dead.

Soviet naval invasion and blockade
In order to speed up the invasion of Sakhalin island and relieve pressure on the ground invasion the Soviet Navy launched an amphibious assault operation against the key Japanese ports. A naval blockade of Sakhalin island was put into place to prevent the evacuation of Japanese troops. Civilian convoys were targeted by Soviet submarines in the Aniva Gulf.

On 16 August, the Soviet coast guard ship Zarnitsa, four minesweepers, two transports, six gunboats and nineteen torpedo boats docked in Port Toro. Around 1,400 Soviet troops of the 365th Separate Marine Battalion and one battalion of the 113th Rifle Brigade landed in Toro (now Shakhtyorsk) and engaged a Japanese garrison of 200 men. Toro was captured and the next day they captured four populated areas and the port city of Esutoru (now Uglegorsk), Anbetsu (now Vozvrashcheniye) and Yerinai. Japanese casualties were 100 killed, 150 wounded and 30 captured. Soviet casualties were 12 killed.

On 20 August, 3,400 troops of the Soviet Navy combined marine battalion and the 113th Rifle Brigade landed in Port Maoka (now Kholmsk). The landing party was met with fierce Japanese defense. A few naval vessels were damaged which led to the Soviet response of intense naval bombardment of the city, causing approximately 600 to 1,000 civilian deaths. Maoka was captured on 22 August, with heavy Japanese resistance continuing throughout the city. Japanese military casualties in this battle were 300 killed and 600 captured. Soviet casualties were 60 army soldiers killed and 17 naval infantry killed.

On 25 August, 1,600 Soviet troops landed in Otomari (now Korsakov). The Japanese garrison of 3,400 men surrendered. The same day the remnants of the Japanese 88th Division surrendered to the 16th Army and the city of Toyohara was captured without resistance officially ending the Invasion of Sakhalin.

Aftermath and casualties 
Japanese casualties are approximately 700 to 2,000 soldiers killed and 3,500 to 3,700 civilians killed. Around 18,202 were captured and many of the Japanese prisoners of war in Sakhalin were sent to labor camps in Siberia and held after the war. At least 100,000 Japanese civilians fled the Soviet occupation during the invasion. The capture of Sakhalin Island proved a necessary prerequisite for the Invasion of the Kuril Islands. After the Japanese surrender, Sakhalin Island remained under Soviet control and is now Russian territory, part of Sakhalin Oblast.

See also 
Battle of Shumshu
Invasion of the Kuril Islands
Evacuation of Karafuto and Kuriles
Project Hula
Soviet assault on Maoka

References

External links

Japan campaign
South Sakhalin
Japan–Soviet Union relations
Karafuto
1945 in Japan
1945 in the Soviet Union
Conflicts in 1945
Invasions by the Soviet Union
Amphibious operations of World War II
August 1945 events in Asia
Sakhalin Oblast